San Sebastián de Mariquita is a town and municipality in the Tolima department of Colombia, about  northwest of Bogotá. This town and municipality contains several important Spanish settlements that were located here due to its vicinity to the Magdalena River. Today, Mariquita is frequented by tourists from the capital visiting attractions like the Medina Waterfalls (Cataratas de Medina) and the mint (Casa de la Moneda). The Spanish conquistador Gonzalo Jiménez de Quesada died there and is buried in the Primatial Cathedral of Bogotá. Today it is home to large hotels and haciendas, among them Villa de los Caballeros.

The population of the municipality was 32,642 as of the 2005 census.

Notable people
 Gilberto Rodríguez Orejuela, drug lord
 Miguel Rodríguez Orejuela, drug lord

References

Municipalities of Tolima Department